Waterford Lake is the main water supply for New Waterford, Nova Scotia, Canada.

It was the scene of the beginning of the battle of New Waterford during the coal mine strikes of 1925.

Lakes of Nova Scotia